Dany Vandenbossche (2 April 1956 – 1 December 2013) was a Belgian politician. As a member of the sp.a, he served from 1999 to 2009 in the Flemish Parliament.

He left politics after his party offered him no electable position in the 2009 elections. In October 2013, he became president of the Louis Paul Boon Society and was also chairman of the Vermeylenfonds. He obtained a master's degree in law and criminology from the University of Ghent.

Vandenbossche, age 57, died on 1 December 2013 in Ghent.

Political mandates

 1990-1995: Vice-Chairman of the CPAS of Ghent
 1995-2006: councilor in Ghent
 1995-1996: Ships of Culture in Ghent
 1995-1999: Belgian representative in the House of Representatives
 2007: community senator in the Senate
 1999-2009: Member of the Flemish Parliament

See also
 List of members of the Senate of Belgium, 2003–07
 List of members of the Flemish Parliament, 2004–09

References

1956 births
2013 deaths
Flemish politicians
Politicians from Bruges
Belgian Socialist Party politicians
Members of the Flemish Parliament
Ghent University alumni